A fireteam or fire team is a small military sub-subunit of infantry designed to optimize "bounding overwatch" and "fire and movement" tactical doctrine in combat. Depending on mission requirements, a typical fireteam consists of four or fewer members: an automatic rifleman, a grenadier, a rifleman, and a designated team leader. The role of each fireteam leader is to ensure that the fireteam operates as a cohesive unit. Two or three fireteams are organized into a section or squad in co-ordinated operations, which is led by a squad leader. Historically, nations with effective fireteam organization have had a significantly better performance from their infantry units in combat than those limited to operations by traditionally larger units.

U.S. Army doctrine recognizes the fire team, or crew, as the smallest military organization while NATO doctrine refers to this level of organization simply as team. Fireteams are the most basic organization upon which modern infantry units are built in the British Army, Royal Air Force Regiment, Royal Marines, United States Army, United States Marine Corps, United States Air Force Security Forces, Canadian Forces, and Australian Army.

Concept

The concept of the fireteam is based on the need for tactical flexibility in infantry operations.  A fireteam is capable of autonomous operations as part of a larger unit.  Successful fireteam employment relies on quality small unit training for soldiers, experience of fireteam members operating together, sufficient communications infrastructure, and a quality non-commissioned officer corps to provide tactical leadership for the team.

These requirements have led to successful use of the fireteam concept by more professional militaries. It is less useful for armies employing massed infantry formations, or with significant conscription. Conscription makes fireteam development difficult, as team members are more effective as they build experience over time working together and building personal bonds.

In open terrain, up to  can be covered by an effective team, although detection range limits effectiveness beyond  or so without special equipment. A team is effective so long as its primary weapon remains operational.

National variations

Canadian
In the Canadian Army "fireteam" refers to two soldiers paired for fire and movement. Two fireteams form an "assault group", which is analogous to most other militaries' understanding of a fireteam; two assault groups and a vehicle group of one driver and one gunner form a section of ten soldiers.
Team leader: An NCO (sergeant if assault group one master corporal if assault group two), carries a C7 rifle.
Rifleman: One corporal or private, carries a C7 rifle.
Grenadier: One corporal or private, carries a C7 rifle with an M203 grenade launcher.
Gunner: One corporal or private, carries a C9 light machine gun.

China
People's Liberation Army forces traditionally used a three-man "cells" (equivalent to fireteams) as the smallest military formation and such organization was widely employed throughout the Second Sino-Japanese War, Chinese Civil War, Korean War, Sino-Indian War, as well as Sino-Vietnamese War. It is unofficially named the "three-three organization". （）

In Chinese sources, this tactic is referred to as "three-three fireteams", after the composition of the attack: three men would form one fireteam, and three fireteams one squad. A Chinese platoon, consisting of 50 men, would form three ranks of such fireteams, which would be employed to attack "one point" from "two sides." With each cell carries at least one automatic weapon (In the Korean War, it was submachine guns or light machine guns. In the early to mid cold war, it was assault rifles or squad automatic weapons), while the rest carried bolt-action rifle or semiautomatic rifle so that each "cell" could independently fire and maneuver.

An example of a People's Volunteer Army fireteam in the late Korean War,
Squad leader/second in command/party member: Carried a Type 50 SMG, acted as the team leader
Rifleman/machine gunner: Carried a Mosin–Nagant rifle or a DP-27 machinegun
Rifleman/assistant machine gunner: Carried a Mosin–Nagant rifle

French
The French section (groupe de combat – "combat group") is divided into two teams. The "fire team" (équipe de feu) is based around the section-level automatic rifle or light machine gun. The "shock team" (équipe de choc), made up of riflemen armed with rifle grenades or disposable rocket launchers, is the reconnaissance and maneuver unit. The teams employ bounding overwatch, with one element covering as the other moves. The team leaders have handheld radios so the elements can stay in contact with each other, as well as with the section leader's backpack radio set. The most common symbol of the modern French junior NCO (chef d'équipe) has been a radio hanging around their neck.

United Kingdom

Infantry units of the British Army, Royal Marines and RAF Regiment introduced the fireteam concept following the adoption of the SA80 rifle and light support weapon. An infantry section of eight men contains two fireteams, Charlie and Delta, each comprising an NCO (corporal or lance corporal) and three privates.
Team leader: This NCO carries an L85 rifle with an L123 underslung grenade launcher. Some units vary with one of the privates carrying the grenade launcher rather than the NCO.
Rifleman: Two privates carry L85 rifles. Under earlier fireteam organization there also were two riflemen, but the second of these was later substituted with a designated marksman, leaving the section with one rifleman per fireteam. From 2019, the earlier organization was restored and the section commander was given discretion to re-role the section gunner as a third rifleman if needed.
Gunner: One private per section carries an L7A2 GPMG. Earlier section organizations had one private per fireteam carrying an L86 light support weapon (intended to replace the L7A2) and then an L110 light machine gun; the L110A3 was removed from service in 2019, with the earlier L7A2 being reinstated as the section machine gun.
Designated marksman: One private per section carries an L129A1 sharpshooter rifle. Earlier fireteam organizations had one private per fireteam carrying either an L86A2 light support weapon or an L129A1 depending on availability; the L86A2 was removed from service in 2019, with the L129A1 officially becoming the standard section DMR.
The fireteam is generally used as a subdivision of the section for fire and maneuver rather than as a separate unit in its own right, although fireteams or fireteam-sized units are often used for reconnaissance tasks, special operations, and urban patrols (usually being to referred to as a "brick" in the latter scenario).

United States

Army
The U.S. Army particularly emphasizes the fireteam concept.
Per U.S. Army doctrine a typical fire team consists of four soldiers.

Team Leader (TL): Usually either a sergeant or corporal (although occasionally a team is led by a specialist or private first class when the platoon has a shortage of junior NCOs). Provides tactical leadership for the team at all times; standard equipped with backpack GPS/radio set, and either an M16 rifle or M4 carbine.
Rifleman (R): Is 'the baseline standard for all infantrymen'. They are equipped with the M16 rifle or M4 carbine. The rifleman is usually assigned with the grenadier to help balance the firepower capabilities of the automatic rifleman.
Grenadier rifleman (GR): Provides limited high-angle fire over "dead zones". A grenadier is equipped with an M4 or M16 with an M203 grenade launcher (or the newer M320 grenade launcher) mounted to the weapon.
Automatic rifleman (AR): Provides overwatch and suppressive fire through force multiplication. The most casualty-producing person in a fireteam, in terms of firepower and maneuverability when compared to the standard nine-man rifle squad. An automatic rifleman is equipped with an M249 light machine gun. The automatic rifleman is usually assigned with the team leader to maximize directed fields of fire and to help balance the firepower capabilities of the grenadier.

In a stryker brigade combat team's (SBCT) infantry rifle companies, one man in each rifle squad fireteam is either the squad anti-armour specialist (RMAT) armed with an FGM-148 Javelin, or the squad designated marksman (DM) who carries an M4 carbine and M14 rifle. In both cases, these two positions replace the basic rifleman of the standard rifle squad.

Marine Corps

The United States Marine Corps doctrine dictates that any active fireteam will include at least one 2-man gunnery-team and summarizes its fireteam organization with the mnemonic "ready-team-fire-assist", the following being the arrangement of the fireteam when in a column:
 Rifleman: acts as a scout for the fireteam; "ready".
 Team leader: uses an M203 and works as the designated grenadier; "team".
 Designated automatic rifleman: uses an M249 light machine gun or M27 IAR and serves as second in command for the fireteam; "fire".
 Assistant automatic rifleman: standard rifleman tasked with providing spotting support, range-finding, carries extra LMG ammunition, and offers close-protection should the fireteam fall under attack; "assist".

Navy
Navy construction force, "Seabee" construction battalions, utilize fireteams (as well as companies, platoons, and squads), similar in size to those employed by the USMC, in their organizational structure. Seabee units may be attached to Marine Corps units.

Other
Many other armed forces see the squad as the smallest military unit; some countries' armies have a pair consisting of two soldiers as the smallest military unit. In others a fireteam is composed of two pairs of soldiers (fire and manuever team) forming a fireteam. Vietnamese communist forces, who received extensive advisory support from Chinese communists, also adopted a fireteam concept similar to that of Chinese, known as "tam tam chế", and such organization is still in use.

History
Fireteams have their origins in the early 20th century. From the Napoleonic Wars until World War I, military tactics involved central control of large numbers of soldiers in mass formation where small units were given little initiative.

Groups of four soldiers were mainly employed for guard duty, or as bodyguards for VIPs. In the Roman Army they were referred to as quaternio (Greek τετράδιον).

Skirmishers in the Napoleonic War would often work in teams of two, ranging ahead of the main group and providing covering fire for each other.

World War I
During World War I, trench warfare resulted in a stalemate on the Western Front. In order to combat this stalemate, the Germans developed a doctrinal innovation known as infiltration tactics (based on the Russian tactics used in the Brusilov Offensive), in which a brief intensive artillery preparation would be followed by small, autonomous teams of stormtroopers, who would covertly penetrate defensive lines. The Germans used their stormtroopers organized into squads at the lowest levels to provide a cohesive strike force in breaking through Allied lines. The British and Canadian troops on the Western Front started dividing platoons into sections after the Battle of the Somme in 1916. (This idea was later further developed in World War II). French Chasseur units in WWI were organized into fireteams, equipped with a light machine gun (Chauchat) team and grenades, to destroy German fire positions by fire (not assault) at up to 200 meters using rifle grenades. The light machine gun team would put suppressive fire on the enemy position, while the grenadier team moved to a position where the enemy embrasure could be attacked with grenades. The Chasseur tactics were proven during the Petain Offensive of 1917. Survivors of these French Chasseur units taught these tactics to American infantry, who used them with effectiveness at St. Mihiel and the Argonne. It was typical of a fireteam in this era to consist of four infantrymen: two assaulters with carbines, one grenadier, and one sapper.

Interbellum
In the inter-war years, United States Marine Corps Captain Evans F. Carlson and Merritt A. Edson are believed to have developed the fireteam concept during the United States occupation of Nicaragua (1912–1933). At that time the US Marine squad consisted of a Corporal and seven Marines all armed with a bolt-action M1903 Springfield rifle and an automatic rifleman armed with a Browning Automatic Rifle. The introduction of the Thompson submachine gun and Winchester Model 1912 shotgun was popular with the Marines as a point-defense weapon for countering ambush by Nicaraguan guerrillas within the thick vegetation that could provide cover for a quick overrun of a patrol. A team of four men armed with these weapons had proven more effective in terms of firepower and maneuverability than the standard nine-man rifle squad.

Carlson, who later went to China in 1937 and observed Communist 8th Route Army units of the National Revolutionary Army in action against the Imperial Japanese Army, brought these ideas back to the US when the country entered World War II. Under his command, the 2nd Marine Raider battalion were issued with the semi-automatic M1 Garand rifle and were organized in the standard 4-man fireteam (although it was called firegroup) concept, 3 firegroups to a squad with a squad leader. A firegroup was composed of an M1 Garand rifleman, a BAR gunner and a submachine gunner. After sustaining severe wounds, Carlson was replaced and his battalion later disbanded and reorganized under conventional Marine doctrine of ten-man squads. Later, Carlson's fireteam concept was re-adopted.

World War II
WWII US Army rifle squads consisted of twelve soldiers divided into three teams: The A "Able" (contemporary spelling alphabet) team consisted of the squad leader and two scouts, the support B "Baker" team of the BAR gunner, assistant gunner, and ammunition bearer, and C "Charlie" team of the assistant squad leader, also serving as the anti-tank grenadier, and five riflemen, one of whom served as the alternate anti-tank grenadier). In an assault the A team would provide overwatch and security or assist the C team in the assault, as the squad leader directed, while the B team provided suppressive fire. Suppressive fire from the BAR would be supplemented by fire from the rifles of his team as he reloaded, and could be further supplemented by platoon medium machine guns.

The US Army Rangers and Special Service Force adopted an early fireteam concept when on campaign in Italy and France. Each squad sub-unit of four or five men was heavily armed, composed of a two-man BAR automatic rifleman and assistant, a scout (marksman/grenadier) armed with an M1903 Springfield with a rifle grenade discharger, and a team leader armed with an M1 carbine or M1 Thompson submachine gun. Their later misuse as conventional infantry negated their special training and fighting skill and their use as "fire brigades" against larger enemy forces negated their advantages in aggressiveness and firepower.

Meanwhile, the communist Chinese established the three-man fireteam concept as the three-man cell when they organized a regular army, and its organization seemed to have been disseminated throughout all of Asia's communist forces, perhaps the most famous of which are the PAVN/NVA (People's Army of Vietnam/North Vietnamese Army) and the Viet Cong.

Battle pair

A battle pair is the smallest unit above the individual soldier, in the modern era chiefly employed by Baltic militaries and special forces like the Special Air Service.  It consists of two soldiers with one soldier acting as senior of the two fighters (decided amongst the two or by their superior). A fireteam in turn consists of at least two fire and maneuver teams, and a squad of two or more fireteams.

It may be known in the US as a fire and maneuver team. The concept is not widely utilized. The United States and most Commonwealth armies rely on the concept of fire teams forming a squad.

Estonia
Such a team is known as a Lahingpaar or battle pair.

Finland
Until 2015 in the Finnish Defence Forces, three taistelupari (combat pairs) formed a squad along with a squad leader. A three-man fireteam is now the smallest standard unit in  Finnish infantry doctrine.

France
The French Army has the concept of a binôme ('pair'). In the regular forces it is the pairing of an experienced soldier with a recruit or replacement. The new soldier learns from the experienced soldier how to properly perform the everyday tasks and responsibilities of his assignment.

In the old colonial forces (like the French Foreign Legion) it was a means of imposing order. The pair were responsible for each other – if one member broke the rules or deserted, the other would be punished for not preventing it.

Sweden
According to the Swedish Armed Forces field manual, a Stridspar working in unison is as effective as four soldiers of same quality acting individually.

See also
 Battle buddy
 Infantry
 Military science
 Sniper team

References

Military units and formations by size
Teams